NSMA may refer to:

 National Sports Media Association
 Maota Airport